The 1952–53 New York Rangers season was the franchise's 27th season. During the regular season, the Rangers compiled a 17–37–16 record and finished with 50 points. The Rangers' last-place finish caused them to miss the NHL playoffs.

Regular season

Final standings

Record vs. opponents

Schedule and results

|- align="center" bgcolor="#FFBBBB"
| 1 || 9 || @ Detroit Red Wings || 5–3 || 0–1–0
|- align="center" bgcolor="#FFBBBB"
| 2 || 12 || @ Chicago Black Hawks || 2–0 || 0–2–0
|- align="center" bgcolor="#FFBBBB"
| 3 || 16 || @ Montreal Canadiens || 3–1 || 0–3–0
|- align="center" bgcolor="#FFBBBB"
| 4 || 18 || @ Toronto Maple Leafs || 4–3 || 0–4–0
|- align="center" bgcolor="white"
| 5 || 19 || @ Boston Bruins || 2–2 || 0–4–1
|- align="center" bgcolor="white"
| 6 || 22 || Boston Bruins || 3–3 || 0–4–2
|- align="center" bgcolor="#CCFFCC"
| 7 || 26 || Detroit Red Wings || 3–2 || 1–4–2
|- align="center" bgcolor="#FFBBBB"
| 8 || 29 || Chicago Black Hawks || 3–1 || 1–5–2
|- align="center" bgcolor="#FFBBBB"
| 9 || 30 || @ Chicago Black Hawks || 8–3 || 1–6–2
|-

|- align="center" bgcolor="#FFBBBB"
| 10 || 1 || @ Montreal Canadiens || 4–1 || 1–7–2
|- align="center" bgcolor="white"
| 11 || 2 || Montreal Canadiens || 2–2 || 1–7–3
|- align="center" bgcolor="#FFBBBB"
| 12 || 5 || @ Toronto Maple Leafs || 4–1 || 1–8–3
|- align="center" bgcolor="#FFBBBB"
| 13 || 9 || @ Detroit Red Wings || 3–1 || 1–9–3
|- align="center" bgcolor="#CCFFCC"
| 14 || 12 || Chicago Black Hawks || 5–2 || 2–9–3
|- align="center" bgcolor="#FFBBBB"
| 15 || 13 || @ Chicago Black Hawks || 6–2 || 2–10–3
|- align="center" bgcolor="#FFBBBB"
| 16 || 16 || Toronto Maple Leafs || 6–3 || 2–11–3
|- align="center" bgcolor="white"
| 17 || 19 || Detroit Red Wings || 2–2 || 2–11–4
|- align="center" bgcolor="white"
| 18 || 23 || Montreal Canadiens || 2–2 || 2–11–5
|- align="center" bgcolor="#CCFFCC"
| 19 || 26 || Toronto Maple Leafs || 4–2 || 3–11–5
|- align="center" bgcolor="#FFBBBB"
| 20 || 27 || @ Boston Bruins || 3–1 || 3–12–5
|- align="center" bgcolor="white"
| 21 || 30 || @ Chicago Black Hawks || 1–1 || 3–12–6
|-

|- align="center" bgcolor="#FFBBBB"
| 22 || 3 || Chicago Black Hawks || 5–3 || 3–13–6
|- align="center" bgcolor="#FFBBBB"
| 23 || 4 || @ Detroit Red Wings || 5–3 || 3–14–6
|- align="center" bgcolor="white"
| 24 || 6 || @ Toronto Maple Leafs || 2–2 || 3–14–7
|- align="center" bgcolor="white"
| 25 || 7 || Montreal Canadiens || 2–2 || 3–14–8
|- align="center" bgcolor="#FFBBBB"
| 26 || 10 || Boston Bruins || 4–1 || 3–15–8
|- align="center" bgcolor="white"
| 27 || 14 || Toronto Maple Leafs || 2–2 || 3–15–9
|- align="center" bgcolor="#CCFFCC"
| 28 || 17 || Boston Bruins || 5–0 || 4–15–9
|- align="center" bgcolor="#FFBBBB"
| 29 || 18 || @ Montreal Canadiens || 6–2 || 4–16–9
|- align="center" bgcolor="white"
| 30 || 20 || @ Detroit Red Wings || 1–1 || 4–16–10
|- align="center" bgcolor="#FFBBBB"
| 31 || 21 || Detroit Red Wings || 5–2 || 4–17–10
|- align="center" bgcolor="#CCFFCC"
| 32 || 25 || @ Boston Bruins || 2–1 || 5–17–10
|- align="center" bgcolor="#FFBBBB"
| 33 || 28 || Chicago Black Hawks || 6–3 || 5–18–10
|- align="center" bgcolor="white"
| 34 || 31 || Toronto Maple Leafs || 3–3 || 5–18–11
|-

|- align="center" bgcolor="#CCFFCC"
| 35 || 4 || Boston Bruins || 5–2 || 6–18–11
|- align="center" bgcolor="#FFBBBB"
| 36 || 7 || Chicago Black Hawks || 6–4 || 6–19–11
|- align="center" bgcolor="white"
| 37 || 8 || @ Montreal Canadiens || 4–4 || 6–19–12
|- align="center" bgcolor="#CCFFCC"
| 38 || 11 || Montreal Canadiens || 7–0 || 7–19–12
|- align="center" bgcolor="#CCFFCC"
| 39 || 14 || Detroit Red Wings || 3–2 || 8–19–12
|- align="center" bgcolor="#FFBBBB"
| 40 || 17 || @ Toronto Maple Leafs || 1–0 || 8–20–12
|- align="center" bgcolor="#FFBBBB"
| 41 || 18 || @ Chicago Black Hawks || 2–0 || 8–21–12
|- align="center" bgcolor="#CCFFCC"
| 42 || 22 || @ Detroit Red Wings || 8–2 || 9–21–12
|- align="center" bgcolor="#FFBBBB"
| 43 || 24 || @ Boston Bruins || 9–0 || 9–22–12
|- align="center" bgcolor="#CCFFCC"
| 44 || 25 || @ Boston Bruins || 2–1 || 10–22–12
|- align="center" bgcolor="#FFBBBB"
| 45 || 28 || Montreal Canadiens || 2–1 || 10–23–12
|- align="center" bgcolor="#FFBBBB"
| 46 || 29 || @ Montreal Canadiens || 5–2 || 10–24–12
|- align="center" bgcolor="#FFBBBB"
| 47 || 31 || @ Toronto Maple Leafs || 4–0 || 10–25–12
|-

|- align="center" bgcolor="#CCFFCC"
| 48 || 1 || @ Chicago Black Hawks || 1–0 || 11–25–12
|- align="center" bgcolor="white"
| 49 || 5 || @ Detroit Red Wings || 3–3 || 11–25–13
|- align="center" bgcolor="white"
| 50 || 8 || Montreal Canadiens || 1–1 || 11–25–14
|- align="center" bgcolor="white"
| 51 || 11 || Detroit Red Wings || 2–2 || 11–25–15
|- align="center" bgcolor="#FFBBBB"
| 52 || 14 || @ Boston Bruins || 5–4 || 11–26–15
|- align="center" bgcolor="#FFBBBB"
| 53 || 15 || Toronto Maple Leafs || 2–1 || 11–27–15
|- align="center" bgcolor="#CCFFCC"
| 54 || 18 || Boston Bruins || 4–2 || 12–27–15
|- align="center" bgcolor="#CCFFCC"
| 55 || 19 || @ Chicago Black Hawks || 4–2 || 13–27–15
|- align="center" bgcolor="#FFBBBB"
| 56 || 21 || @ Montreal Canadiens || 4–1 || 13–28–15
|- align="center" bgcolor="#FFBBBB"
| 57 || 22 || Detroit Red Wings || 2–1 || 13–29–15
|- align="center" bgcolor="#CCFFCC"
| 58 || 25 || Boston Bruins || 2–1 || 14–29–15
|- align="center" bgcolor="#FFBBBB"
| 59 || 28 || @ Toronto Maple Leafs || 3–0 || 14–30–15
|-

|- align="center" bgcolor="#CCFFCC"
| 60 || 1 || Toronto Maple Leafs || 4–2 || 15–30–15
|- align="center" bgcolor="#FFBBBB"
| 61 || 4 || Chicago Black Hawks || 4–1 || 15–31–15
|- align="center" bgcolor="#FFBBBB"
| 62 || 5 || @ Detroit Red Wings || 7–1 || 15–32–15
|- align="center" bgcolor="#CCFFCC"
| 63 || 7 || @ Boston Bruins || 2–1 || 16–32–15
|- align="center" bgcolor="#CCFFCC"
| 64 || 8 || Montreal Canadiens || 4–3 || 17–32–15
|- align="center" bgcolor="#FFBBBB"
| 65 || 11 || Detroit Red Wings || 2–0 || 17–33–15
|- align="center" bgcolor="#FFBBBB"
| 66 || 14 || @ Montreal Canadiens || 3–2 || 17–34–15
|- align="center" bgcolor="white"
| 67 || 15 || Toronto Maple Leafs || 1–1 || 17–34–16
|- align="center" bgcolor="#FFBBBB"
| 68 || 18 || Boston Bruins || 2–1 || 17–35–16
|- align="center" bgcolor="#FFBBBB"
| 69 || 21 || @ Toronto Maple Leafs || 5–0 || 17–36–16
|- align="center" bgcolor="#FFBBBB"
| 70 || 22 || Chicago Black Hawks || 3–1 || 17–37–16
|-

Playoffs
The Rangers finished in last place in the NHL and failed to qualify for the 1953 Stanley Cup playoffs.

Player statistics
Skaters

Goaltenders

†Denotes player spent time with another team before joining Rangers. Stats reflect time with Rangers only.
‡Traded mid-season. Stats reflect time with Rangers only.

Awards and records

The New York Rangers did not have any players chosen for the All-Star Teams for the 1952–53 NHL season.

Transactions
The following is a list of all transactions that occurred for the Rangers during the 1952–53 NHL season. It lists which team each player was traded to and for which player(s) or other consideration(s), if applicable.

References

New York Rangers seasons
New York Rangers
New York Rangers
New York Rangers
New York Rangers
Madison Square Garden
1950s in Manhattan